Paul John Kelly (born 11 October 1947) is an Australian political journalist, author and television and radio commentator from Sydney. He has worked in a variety of roles, principally for The Australian newspaper, and is currently its editor-at-large. Kelly also appears as a commentator on Sky News and has written seven books on political events in Australia since the 1970s including on the 1975 Australian constitutional crisis. Recent works include, The March of Patriots, which chronicles the creation of a modern Australia during the 1991–2007 era of Prime Ministers, Paul Keating and John Howard, and Triumph & Demise which focuses on the leadership tensions at the heart of the Rudd-Gillard Labor Governments of 2007–2011. Kelly presented the Australian Broadcasting Corporation (ABC) TV documentary series, 100 Years – The Australian Story (2001) and wrote a book of the same title.

In 2006, Kelly's work was described by fellow Australian journalists, Toby Creswell and Samantha Trenoweth, "[It] is distinguished for his broad and deep grasp of the inter-relationship of economics and political shifts, and his ability to place Australian domestic developments into an international and historical context".

Biography
Paul John Kelly was born on 11 October 1947 in Sydney, New South Wales. He is the son of Joseph Kelly and Sybil (née Mackenzie). He completed a Bachelor of Arts and Diploma of Education at the University of Sydney in 1969. He worked in the Prime Minister's Department in Canberra from 1969 to 1971 before changing to journalism. He is a Doctor of Letters from the University of Melbourne.

He joined the Canberra Press Gallery in 1971 and became chief political correspondent for The Australian from 1974 to 1975. From 1976 to 1978 he was chief political correspondent for The National Times, then its deputy editor from 1978 to 1979. He became chief political correspondent for the Sydney Morning Herald from 1981 to 1984. He returned to The Australian and was its national affairs editor from 1985 to 1991, editor-in-chief from 1991 to 1996 and editor-at-large since 1996 to present.

Aside from journalism, Kelly has written books describing political developments starting with The Unmaking of Gough (1976) on the Australian constitutional crisis of 1975 and Prime Minister Gough Whitlam (later titled The Dismissal : Australia's Most Sensational Power Struggle : The Dramatic Fall of Gough Whitlam). He has written books on subsequent Prime Ministers, Bob Hawke (The Hawke Ascendency, 1984), Paul Keating (The End of Certainty, 1992) and John Howard (Howard's Decade, 2006). His The March of Patriots: The Struggle for Modern Australia (2009) deals with economic and political developments under Keating and Howard as Australia entered the globalised age. Triumph & Demise: The Broken Promise of a Labor Generation (2014) chronicles the rise and fall of the Australian Labor Party governments of Kevin Rudd and Julia Gillard (2007–2013).

His book, The Dismissal was used as the basis of the television miniseries The Dismissal shown on Network Ten from 6 March 1983. Kelly is a political commentator on radio and television (including Insiders) and presented the Australian Broadcasting Corporation (ABC) TV documentary series, 100 Years – The Australian Story (2001) and wrote a book of the same title.

In November 1991, after the massacres at Santa Cruz (near Dili, East Timor), Kelly had supported Indonesian President Suharto and declared him to be a moderate with no alternative to his rule. Kelly's support for Suharto continued to 1998 and earned criticism from fellow journalist John Pilger who compared it to the appeasement of Hitler in the 1930s.

In November 2012, Kelly criticised the decision of the Gillard government to create the Royal Commission into Institutional Responses to Child Sexual Abuse, calling it "profoundly ignorant" and "a depressing example of populist politics".

Personal life
He is married to Margaret (née Leckie). They have two sons – Joseph and Daniel. Kelly was previously married to Australian Labor Party Federal Member of Parliament and Minister Ros Kelly (née Raw).

Paul Kelly opposed Australia's same-sex marriage legislation, questioning the "real ideology" of the same-sex marriage campaign and its impact on "religious freedom".

Bibliography

Books
 
 
 
 
 
 
 
 
 
 
 
 
 
 
 
 
 Kelly, Paul (2014). Triumph and Demise: The Broken Promise of a Labor Generation, Carlton, Vic: Melbourne University Press.

Essays and reporting

Critical studies and reviews of Kelly's work
The Dismissal : in the Queen's name
.
November 1975

The truth of the Palace Letters

Awards 
 1990 Graham Perkin Australian Journalist of the Year Award
 2001 Walkley Awards for both Journalism Leadership and Commentary, Analysis, Opinion & Critique
 2005 Dunlop Asialink Medalist
2014 Walkley Book Award for Triumph and Demise

See also
Australian settlement, term coined by Kelly and widely adopted

Notes

External links
 December 2001 Speech (PDF) about Australian journalism and anti-intellectualism
 Profile for Insiders at the Australian Broadcasting Corporation

1947 births
Living people
Australian political journalists
Walkley Award winners
University of Sydney alumni
Journalists from Sydney
1975 Australian constitutional crisis
The Australian journalists
Quadrant (magazine) people
Australian republicans
The Sydney Morning Herald people